The river Lyevaya Lyasnaya (Belarusian: Левая Лясная) is a river in western Belarus. At its confluence with the Pravaya Lyasnaya near Kamyanyets, the Lyasnaya is formed. The Lyasnaya is a right tributary of the Bug River northwest of Brest. Average discharge at the mouth of 3.6 m3. The average slope of water surface 0.5 ‰.

The Lyevaya Lyasnaya flows through Pruzhany Raion and Kamenets Raion areas of Brest Voblast of Belarus.

The river flows through: Mylnisk, Kamyanyets, Vuglyany.

Tributaries: Leśna Prawa, Wishnia.

See also 

 Leśna Prawa

Further reading 
 Блакітная кніга Беларусі: Энцыкл. / БелЭн; Рэдкал.: Н.А. Дзісько і інш. — Мн.: БелЭн, 1994.
 Ресурсы поверхностных вод СССР. Описание рек и озёр и расчёты основных характеристик их режима. Т. 5. Белоруссия и Верхнее Поднепровье. Ч. 1–2. — Л., 1971.
 Природа Белоруссии: Попул. энцикл./ БелСЭ; Редкол.: И.П. Шамякин (гл.ред.) и др. — Мн.: БелСЭ, 1986. — 599 с., 40 л. ил.

Rivers of Brest Region
Rivers of Belarus